Legendary is the eighth studio album by rapper AZ, released on June 2, 2009, through Real Talk Entertainment.

Track listing

References 

2009 albums
Albums produced by Cozmo
Albums produced by Maxwell Smart (record producer)
Albums produced by Big Hollis
AZ (rapper) albums
Real Talk Entertainment albums